Versailles-Château–Rive Gauche is a station on line C of the Paris Region's express suburban rail system, the RER. The station was named  ("Versailles–left bank") until February 2012, and was renamed to help tourists find their way to the Château.

Lines serving this station
 RER line C

Services using the station
Trains VICK and VITY from Paris terminate at Versailles-Château-Rive Gauche, and the station is also the origin of CIME, CITY and JILL trains.

Gallery

See also
 List of stations of the Paris RER

References

External links

 

Railway stations in France opened in 1864
Réseau Express Régional stations
Railway stations in Yvelines
Transport in Versailles